Misharin is a surname. Notable people with the surname include:

 Aleksandr Misharin (screenwriter) (1939—2008), Soviet-Russian screenwriter, playwright, novelist, actor, and editor 
 Alexander Misharin (born 1959), Russian politician
 Georgi Misharin (born 1985), Russian ice hockey player
 Yevgeny Misharin (born 1990), Russian futsal player

See also
 Mishar (disambiguation)